Reiner Schöne (born 19 January 1942) is a German actor, known for such roles as Dukhat in the Babylon 5 series, Shinnok in Mortal Kombat: Annihilation, Esoqq in the Star Trek: The Next Generation episode "Allegiance", Kolitar in the television series Sliders and The Eiger Sanction as Karl Freytag, and as Optimus Prime in the German dub of the live-action Transformers film series.

Partial filmography

Wir lassen uns scheiden (1968) - Körner
12 Uhr mittags kommt der Boß (1969) - Barmixer Lundas
Return of Sabata (1971) - Clyde / Lieutenant
Zwei himmlische Dickschädel (1974) - Vilmos
The Eiger Sanction (1975) - Karl Freytag 
Change (1975) - Blasius Okopenki
 (1976) - Horobin
 (1976, TV miniseries) - Hoym, Bandit
Goetz von Berlichingen of the Iron Hand (1979) - Franz von Sickingen
Return to Treasure Island (1986, TV series) - Van Der Brecken
La rebelión de los colgados (1986)
Amerika (1987, TV miniseries) - Major Helmut Gurtman
The Gunfighters (1987, TV film) - Dutch Everett 
The Handmaid's Tale (1990) - Luke
Star Trek: The Next Generation - Allegiance (1990, TV series episode) - Esoqq
MacGyver: The Wall (1990, TV series episode) - Helmut Weiss
Nobody's Children (1994) - Sorin Dornescu
Crash Dive (1997) - Richter 
Babylon 5: Atonement (1997, TV series episode) - Dukhat
Mortal Kombat: Annihilation (1997) - Shinnok
Babylon 5: In the Beginning (1998, TV film based on the TV series) - Dukhat 
Sliders (1998, TV series) - Kolitar
 (1999, TV film) - Killer
Wasted in Babylon (1999) - Roman
Otto – Der Katastrofenfilm (2000) - Kapitän Lackner
Ice Planet (2001) - Senator Jeremy Uvan
Null Uhr 12 (2001) - Kommissar 
Pretend You Don't See Her (2002, TV film) - Jimmy Greco 
 (2002) - Pharaoh Thutmosis
Traumschiff Surprise – Periode 1 (2004) - Senator Bean
Snowman's Land (2010) - Berger
Teufelskicker (2010) - Opa Rudi
Priest (2011) - Minister
The Fourth State (2012) - Sokolow
 (2012) - Frederik Losensky
 (2013) - Doctoral advisor
A Heavy Heart (2015) - Specht

Voice Acting, Dubbing

Atlantis: The Lost Empire (2001) - Commander Rourke (German version)
Spider-Man (2002) - Norman Osborn / Green Goblin (German version)
Star Wars: Episode III – Revenge of the Sith (2005) - Darth Vader (German version)
Transformers (2007) - Optimus Prime (German version)
Transformers: Revenge of the Fallen (2009) - Optimus Prime (German version)
Iron Man 2 (2010) - Ivan Vanko / Whiplash (German version)
Transformers: Dark of the Moon (2011) - Optimus Prime (German version)
Transformers: Age of Extinction (2014) - Optimus Prime (German version)
Transformers: The Last Knight (2017) - Optimus Prime (German version)
Bumblebee (2018) - Optimus Prime (German version)

References

External links 

1942 births
Living people
German male film actors
German male television actors
German male voice actors
20th-century German male actors
21st-century German male actors
People from Fritzlar